Frio Frio or Frio, Frio (English: Cold, Cold) is the lead single of the sixth studio album Areito by Dominican superstar Juan Luis Guerra. The track is a bachata and was wrote based on a poem by Federico García Lorca and was released in August 1991. The track was receive positive reviews by the critics and was nominated for Tropical Salsa Song of the Year at the 4th Lo Nuestro Awards. Frio Frio was a success peaking at number 4 on Billboard Hot Latin Tracks and at the Top 5 airplay in Panama and Uruguay.

The track was included on Guerra's greatest hits album Grandes Éxitos Juan Luis Guerra y 440 and Coleccion Romantica (2001). In 2013, a live version of the song with Romeo Santos was released as lead single of Guerra's live album A Son de Guerra Tour (2013).

Tracklist 

 Spain 12", Maxi-Single (1993)
 Frio Frio – 4:08
 Frio Frio (Kareoke Version) – 4:08
 La Bilirrubina
 Europe CD, Maxi-Single (1993)
 Frio Frio – 4:08
 Frio Frio (Instrumental) – 4:08
 La Bilirrubina – 4:01

Charts

References 

1991 songs
Juan Luis Guerra songs
Songs written by Juan Luis Guerra
1991 singles